Mihai Marian Onicaș (born 27 January 1990) is a Romanian footballer who plays as a defensive midfielder for Liga III side Minerul Ocna Dej.

Club career
On 10 June 2009 played his first match in Liga I for Steaua București against Unirea Urziceni. Later that year, on 16 July, Onicas made his European Cup debut in the 2–0 victory for Steaua in the UEFA Europa League against Újpest FC.

On 2 February 2010 he was loaned for six months to fellow Liga I team Politehnica Iași so that he would get more playing time.

In June 2011, after not making a breakthrough at Steaua, Onicaș signed for Viitorul Constanța. After just a year, he helped the team gain promotion to the Liga I.

International career
On 12 August 2009 he made his debut for Romania U-21 against Andorra U-21, Romania won with 2–0.

References

External links
 
 
 

1990 births
Living people
Romanian footballers
Association football midfielders
Romania under-21 international footballers
Sportspeople from Cluj-Napoca
Liga I players
Liga II players
Liga III players
FC Universitatea Cluj players
FC Steaua București players
FC Steaua II București players
CSM Deva players
ASA 2013 Târgu Mureș players
FC Olimpia Satu Mare players
FC Viitorul Constanța players
ACS Sticla Arieșul Turda players
FC Unirea Dej players
Moldovan Super Liga players
Speranța Nisporeni players
Romanian expatriate footballers
Romanian expatriate sportspeople in Moldova
Expatriate footballers in Moldova